The list of hotels in Singapore provides hotel names by location within Singapore.

By location

Central
Goodwood Park Hotel
Rendezvous Hotel Singapore

Chinatown

Damenlou Hotel
New Majestic Hotel
The Scarlet Singapore

Downtown
Fairmont Singapore
Oasia Hotel Downtown
Parkroyal Collection Pickering
Raffles Hotel
The New 7th Storey Hotel
South Beach Tower
Swissôtel The Stamford

Marina Centre
Conrad Centennial Singapore
The Fullerton Hotel Singapore
Mandarin Oriental
Marina Bay Sands
The Pan Pacific Singapore
Parkroyal Collection Marina Bay
The Ritz-Carlton Millenia Singapore

Orchard Road
Hilton Singapore Orchard
Holiday Inn Park View Singapore
Shangri-La Hotel Singapore
St Regis Singapore

Sentosa
Capella Singapore

 Crockfords Tower, formerly planned to be named Maxims Tower, is an 11-storey all-suite hotel overlooking the Singapore harbour and the Southern Islands. The resort's casino is located beneath the tower. The hotel was topped-out on 27 February 2009 and opened on 20 January 2010. Both the latter and Hotel Michael (11-storey hotel named after Michael Graves, topped out on 15 July 2009 and was opened on 20 January 2010), sits on the area of the former Sentosa Musical Fountain. The hotel also features Crockfords Premier, a casino club with private rooms for high rollers located on the 10th floor.

Gallery

See also
 Lists of hotels – an index of hotel list articles on Wikipedia

References

 
Hotels
Singapore
Singapore